Hardwood is a 2005 documentary short film about Canadian director Hubert Davis' relationship to his father, former Harlem Globetrotters member Mel Davis. Through interviews with his mother, his father's wife, his half-brother, and Mel Davis himself, Hubert Davis explores why Mel made the decisions that he did, and how that has affected his life.

Hardwood was met with high critical acclaim and received an Academy Award nomination for Best Documentary Short Subject. It also aired on PBS as part of its Point of View series in 2005.

References

External links
 
 P.O.V. Hardwood - PBS's site dedicated to the film
 NFB Web site

2005 short documentary films
2005 films
National Film Board of Canada documentaries
2005 directorial debut films
Documentary films about sportspeople
Documentary films about African Americans
Canadian short documentary films
Harlem Globetrotters
Films directed by Hubert Davis
Films set in Vancouver
Documentary films about basketball
National Film Board of Canada short films
Canadian basketball films
Documentary films about Black Canadians
Canadian sports documentary films
2000s English-language films
2000s Canadian films